Dick Poole may refer to:

 Dick Poole (cyclist), English cyclist
 Dick Poole (footballer) (1872–1939), Australian rules football player for Collingwood
 Dick Poole (rugby league) (born 1930), Australian former rugby league footballer and coach
 Dick Poole Fillies' Stakes, a horse race run at Salisbury Racecourse

See also
 Richard Poole (disambiguation)